Bill Evo (born February 21, 1954) is an American lawyer and a former professional ice hockey player and executive.

Hockey career
Evo played major junior hockey in the Ontario Hockey League with the Peterborough Petes from 1971 to 1974. He was selected by the Detroit Red Wings of the National Hockey League (NHL) in the third round (45th overall) of the 1974 NHL amateur draft, and was also drafted by the Cincinnati Stingers in the second round (22nd overall) of the 1974 WHA Secret Amateur Draft. Between 1974 and 1976, Evo played 97 games in the World Hockey Association, with the Michigan Stags/Baltimore Blades (team moved mid-season), Edmonton Oilers and Cleveland Crusaders, scoring 14 goals and 18 assists for 32 points, while earning 85 penalty minutes.

Evo was appointed the president of the Detroit Red Wings in September 1995, but resigned on July 23, 1996, after serving just 10 months at the Red Wing's helm.

Legal career
Evo graduated from the University of Western Ontario, and earned his Juris Doctor degree from the University of Detroit Law School.

References

External links
 
 

1954 births
American men's ice hockey centers
Baltimore Blades players
Cincinnati Stingers draft picks
Cleveland Crusaders players
Detroit Red Wings draft picks
Edmonton Oilers (WHA) players
Ice hockey people from Michigan
Living people
Michigan Stags players
Peterborough Petes (ice hockey) players
Philadelphia Firebirds (NAHL) players
Sportspeople from Royal Oak, Michigan
Syracuse Blazers players
Ice hockey players from Michigan